The Ganda or Gandawa are a indigenous community from the eastern Indian states of Odisha and Chhattisgarh. They mainly live in western Odisha and adjoining parts of Chhattisgarh, especially in Bolangir and Bargarh districts. They practise adult marriage and are mainly monogamous. Marriages are mainly arranged through negotiation, while mutual consent is also respected. junior levirate, junior sororate, remarriage of widows, widowers, and divorcees are permitted. They follow the puberty function and have birth pollution. They practise both cremation and burial to dispose of their dead. Their traditional occupations are as weavers and village watchmen and they also served as village headmen. They also play drums during special occasions.

Ganda Baja 
The music uses drums (or ), pipes and cymbals. On every Monday in Bora Sambar, a region of Bargarh, the priest performs the  ritual, where the goddess possesses the priest and puts him into a trance. It is said only the  instruments allow this  to occur, and the playing of the instruments by the Gandas helps the goddess focus her  on the priest, who could lose control due to the sheer strength of her power. During this ritual, the priest can heal people who are suffering ailments such as barrenness due to the  he channels, thanks to the Ganda orchestra.

References 

Social groups of Odisha
Dalit communities
Scheduled Castes of Chhattisgarh
Social groups of Chhattisgarh
Musician castes